Euphorbia ocellata is a species of Euphorbia known by the common name Contura Creek sandmat. It is native to the southwestern United States where it grows in many types of habitats. This is a small annual herb with pairs of oblong to lance-shaped leaves, each leaf up to about 1.5 centimeters long. The inflorescence is a cyathium only 2 millimeters wide. It consists of petal-like appendages surrounding the actual flowers, each with a round nectar gland at its base. The appendages are sometimes absent. The flowers include one female flower ringed by up to 60 male flowers. The fruit is a lobed, spherical capsule less than 3 millimeters wide.

There are three subspecies. One, the Stony Creek spurge or Rattan's sandmat (ssp. rattanii), is endemic to the northern Sacramento Valley of California.

External links
Jepson Manual Treatment
USDA Plants Profile
Photo gallery

ocellata